A seat is a place to sit. The term may encompass additional features, such as back, armrest, head restraint but also headquarters in a wider sense.

Types of seat 

The following are examples of different kinds of seat:

 Armchair, a chair equipped with armrests
 Airline seat, for passengers in an aircraft
 Bar stool, a high stool used in bars and many houses 
 Bench, a long hard seat
 Bicycle seat, a saddle on a bicycle
 Car seat, a seat in an automobile
 Cathedra, a seat for a bishop located in a cathedral 
 Chair, a seat with a back
 Chaise longue, a soft chair with leg support
 Couch, a long soft seat
 Ejection seat, rescue seat in an aircraft
 Folding seat
 Hard seat
 Infant car seat, for a small child in a car
 Jump seat, auxiliary seat in a vehicle
 Pew, a long seat in a church, synagogue, or courtroom
 Saddle, a type of seat used on the backs of animals, bicycles, lap etc.
 Sliding seat, in a rowing boat
 Sofa, alternative name for couch
 Stool, a seat with no armrests or back
 Throne, a seat for a monarch

Etymology
The word seat comes from Middle English sete, Old English gesete/geseten and/or sǣte seat, sittan to sit. Possibly related to or cognate with Old Norse sæti. The first known use of the word seat is in the 13th century.

Ergonomics
For someone seated, the 'buttock popliteal' length is the horizontal distance from the rearmost part of the buttocks to the back of the lower leg. This anthropometric measurement is used to determine seat depth.

See also
Chair
Seating assignment
Seating capacity

References

 
Furniture

de:Möbel#Sitzmöbel